Geoffrey Dyson Palmer  (4 June 1927 – 5 November 2020) was an English actor. He was best known for his roles in British television sitcoms playing Jimmy Anderson in The Fall and Rise of Reginald Perrin (1976–79), Ben Parkinson in Butterflies (1978–1983) and Lionel Hardcastle in As Time Goes By (1992–2005). His film appearances include A Fish Called Wanda (1988), The Madness of King George (1994), Mrs Brown (1997) and Tomorrow Never Dies (1997).

Early life and education
Geoffrey Dyson Palmer was born on 4 June 1927 in London, England. He was the son of Frederick Charles Palmer, who was a chartered surveyor, and Norah Gwendolen (née Robins). He attended Highgate School from September 1939 to December 1945. He served as a corporal instructor in small arms and field training in the Royal Marines during his national service from 1946 to 1948, following which he briefly worked as an unpaid trainee assistant stage manager.

Career
Palmer's early television appearances included multiple roles in episodes of The Army Game (Granada Television), two episodes of The Baron and as a property agent in Cathy Come Home (1966). After a major break in John Osborne's West of Suez at the Royal Court with Ralph Richardson, he acted in major productions at the Royal Court and for the National Theatre Company and was directed by Laurence Olivier in J. B. Priestley's Eden End. Palmer found the play so boring, however, that it put him off a stage career for good. 

Two BBC sitcom roles brought him attention in the 1970s: the hapless brother-in-law of Reggie Perrin in The Fall and Rise of Reginald Perrin (1976–79), and the phlegmatic dentist Ben Parkinson in Butterflies (1978–1983). He also played Doctor Price in the Fawlty Towers episode "The Kipper and the Corpse" (1979), determined to have breakfast amidst the confusion caused by the death of a guest and Fawlty's inept way of handling the emergency. In 1986, Palmer appeared as Donald Fairchild in the first series of an ITV sitcom, Executive Stress, alongside Penelope Keith. He later left, and was replaced by Peter Bowles.

Palmer later starred opposite Judi Dench for over a decade in another BBC sitcom, As Time Goes By (1992–2005). In 1997, he also appeared with Dench in the James Bond film Tomorrow Never Dies, in which he portrayed Admiral Roebuck, and Mrs Brown, playing Sir Henry Ponsonby to Dench's Queen Victoria.

Palmer's voice-over skills led to frequent work in commercials. Campaigns he was involved with include the 'Slam in the Lamb' ads for the Meat & Livestock Commission and the Audi commercials in which he was heard using the phrase "Vorsprung durch Technik". As a narrator, he worked on the BBC series' Grumpy Old Men and Grumpy Old Holidays, as well as narrating the audiobook version of Dickens' A Christmas Carol, released in 2005 as a podcast by Penguin Books. He narrated the documentary series Little England, and he continued to appear in productions written by Reggie Perrin creator David Nobbs, the last of these being the radio comedy The Maltby Collection broadcast from 2007.

In the 2006 DVD series The Compleat Angler, Palmer partnered Rae Borras in a series of episodes based on Izaak Walton's 1653 The Compleat Angler. In 2007, he recorded The Diary of a Nobody by George Grossmith and Weedon Grossmith as an online audiobook. In December 2007, Palmer appeared in the role of the Captain in "Voyage of the Damned", the Christmas special episode of the BBC science-fiction series Doctor Who; Palmer previously appeared in the classic era of the show in the Third Doctor serials Doctor Who and the Silurians (1970) (as Masters) and The Mutants (1972) (as the Administrator). In March 2009, he joined in a sketch with the two double acts Armstrong and Miller and Mitchell and Webb for Comic Relief. In 2011, he played the reactionary father-in-law of the eponymous clergyman of Rev. in its Christmas episode.

Personal life and death
Palmer married Sally Green in 1963. They had a daughter, Harriet, and a son, Charles, a television director. Palmer lived at Lee Common in the Chiltern Hills, Buckinghamshire, and enjoyed fly fishing in his spare time.

Palmer died at his home on 5 November 2020 following a short illness, aged 93.

Awards and recognition
In the New Year's Honours List published 31 December 2004 he was appointed an Officer of the Order of the British Empire (OBE) for services to drama. A drawing of Palmer by Stuart Pearson Wright is in the collection of the National Portrait Gallery, London.

Appearances

Stage
Sabrina Fair by Samuel Taylor at the Theatre Royal, Nottingham (1955).
Eden End by J. B. Priestley at the Royal National Theatre (1974).
Kafka's Dick by Alan Bennett at the Royal Court Theatre (1986).
West of Suez by John Osbourne.

Radio
 At Home with the Snails (2001–2002)
 Les Misérables as Inspector Javert (2002)
 The Man Who Was Thursday (2005)
 High Table, Lower Orders (2005–2006)
 The Maltby Collection (2007–2009)
 A Murder of Quality (2009)
 The Screwtape Letters as C.S. Lewis (2009) 
 North by Northamptonshire (2011–2012)
 Two Pipe Problems: The Case of the Missing Meerschaum as Mortimer Tregennis (2011)

Television

The Army Game (1958–1960) as Various Characters
The Strange World of Gurney Slade (1960) as Television Studio Floor Manager in Episode 1
The Avengers:
 "Propellant 23" (1962) as Paul Manning
 "Man with Two Shadows" (1963) as Dr. Terence
 "A Surfeit of H2O" (1965) as Martin Smythe
The Saint:
"The Rough Diamonds" (1963) as Pete Ferguson
Gideon's Way (TV Series) 
"The Alibi Man" (1965) as Jeff Grant
Out of the Unknown
 "No Place Like Earth" (1965) as Chief Officer
The Baron: 
"Masquerade" (1966) as Anstruther
"The Killing" (1966) as Anstruther
The Wednesday Play:
Cathy Come Home (1966) as Property Agent
Mrs Thursday (1966) as Henry Baxter
 Best of Enemies (1968) as Johnson
Doctor Who
"Doctor Who and the Silurians" (1970) as Masters
"The Mutants" (1972) as Administrator
"Voyage of the Damned" (2007) as Captain Hardaker
Colditz – Gone Away Part 1 (1972) as Doc
Whodunnit! (1975) as Suspect
The Fall and Rise of Reginald Perrin (1976–1979) as Jimmy Anderson
Butterflies (1978–1983) as Ben Parkinson
The Sweeney (1978) as Commander Watson in "Feet of Clay"
The Professionals (1978) as Sinclair in "Where The Jungle Ends"
Fawlty Towers- "The Kipper and the Corpse" (1979) as Dr. Price
The Goodies (1980) as School Headmaster
The Last Song (1981) as Leo Bannister
Whoops Apocalypse (1982) as Foreign Secretary
Death of an Expert Witness (1983) as Dr. Edwin Lorrimer 
The Professionals (1983) as Avery in "The Ojuka Situation"
Fairly Secret Army (1984–1986) as Major Harry Kitchener Wellington Truscott
Executive Stress (1986 first series only) as Donald Fairchild No. 1
Season's Greetings (1986) as Bernard
Hot Metal (1986) as Harold Stringer
Christabel (1988) as Mr. Burton
Blackadder Goes Forth 
"Goodbyeee" (1989); as Field Marshal Douglas Haig
Inspector Morse
 "The Infernal Serpent" (1990) as Matthew Copley-Barnes
Bergerac
 "Roots of Evil" (1990)as Nigel Carter
As Time Goes By (1992–2005) as Lionel Hardcastle 
Mr. Men and Little Miss as the Narrator and Santa Claus (in "The Christmas Letter")
The Legacy of Reginald Perrin (1996) as Jimmy Anderson
Alice through the Looking Glass (1998) as White King
The Savages (2001) as Donald
The 1940s House (2001) as Narrator
Stig of the Dump (2002) as Robert
Absolute Power (2003) as Lord Harcourt
Grumpy Old Men (2003–2004, 2006) as Narrator
He Knew He Was Right (2004) as Sir Marmaduke Rowley
Grumpy Old Holidays (2006) as Narrator
Ashes to Ashes:
 "Episode 8" (2008); as Lord Scarman
The Long Walk to Finchley (2008); as John Crowder
Agatha Christie's Poirot:
 "The Clocks" (2011) as Vice Admiral Hamling
Grandpa in My Pocket
 "Captain Dumbletwit's Toughest Mission Yet!" (2010) as Grandad Gillbert
Rev
 "Christmas Special" Series 2, episode 7 (2011) as Martin
Henry IV, Part II (2012); as Lord Chief Justice
Royal Variety Performance (2014); as the announcer (voice-only)

Film

A Prize of Arms (1962) as Cpl. Myers
Incident at Midnight (1963) as Dr. Tanfield
Ring of Spies (1964) as Police Officer (uncredited)
Cast a Giant Shadow (1966) as David (uncredited)
O Lucky Man! (1973) as Examinator Doctor / Basil Keyes
The Battle of Billy's Pond (1976) – First Policeman
The Outsider (1979) as Colonel Wyndham 
The Honorary Consul (1983) as Belfrage: British Ambassador
A Zed & Two Noughts (1985) as Fallast
Clockwise (1986) as Headmaster
A Fish Called Wanda (1988) as Judge
Hawks (1988) as SAAB Salesman
The Madness of King George (1994) as Warren
Mrs. Brown (1997) as Henry Ponsonby
Tomorrow Never Dies (1997) as Admiral Roebuck
Stiff Upper Lips (1998) as His Butler's Voice
Anna and the King (1999) as Lord John Bradley
Rat (2000) as The Doctor
Peter Pan (2003) as Sir Edward Quiller Couch 
Piccadilly Jim (2004) as Bayliss
The Pink Panther 2 (2009) as Joubert
W.E. (2011) as Stanley Baldwin
Lost Christmas (2011) as Dr. Clarence
Run for Your Wife (2012) as Man on Bus
Bert and Dickie (2012) as Charles Burnell
The Last Sparks of Sundown (2014) as Sir Buster Sparks (voice)
Paddington (2014) as The Boss Geographer
To Olivia (2021) as Geoffrey Fisher (final film role)

Recordings (spoken word)

Welcome to the Pleasuredome (Fruitness Mix) (1985)

Esio Trot (1990)

The BFG (1989)

A Christmas Carol (2005)

The Diary of a Nobody (2007)

References

External links

 Selected performances in Theatre Archive University of Bristol

1927 births
2020 deaths
20th-century English male actors
21st-century English male actors
20th-century Royal Marines personnel
Audiobook narrators
British male comedy actors
English male film actors
English male radio actors
English male stage actors
English male television actors
English male voice actors
Male actors from Buckinghamshire
Male actors from London
Officers of the Order of the British Empire
People educated at Highgate School
Royal Marines ranks